Samanea is a genus of flowering plants in the family Fabaceae. It belongs to the mimosoid clade of the subfamily Caesalpinioideae.  The type species is Samanea saman from South America.

Taxonomy 
The name Samanea comes from saman in Spanish derived from zamang used for Samanea saman, this giant S. saman tree was seen by  Alexander von Humboldt near Maracay, Venezuela in 1799 when he travelled to the Americas from that year to 1804.

Species 
Plants of the World Online lists the following accepted species:
 Samanea guineensis (G.C.C.Gilbert & Boutique) Brenan & Brummitt
 Samanea inopinata (Harms) Barneby & J.W.Grimes
 Samanea leptophylla (Harms) Brenan & Brummitt
 Samanea saman (Jacq.) Merr.
 Samanea tubulosa (Benth.) Barneby & J.W.Grimes

References 

Mimosoids
Fabaceae genera
Taxa named by George Bentham